William Yonge may refer to:

 Sir William Yonge, 4th Baronet (c. 1693–1755), English politician
William Yonge (15th century MP) for Newcastle-under-Lyme
William Yonge (MP for Bristol), in 1361, MP for Bristol
William Yonge (priest) (1753–1845), Archdeacon of Norwich
William Yonge (judge) (died c.1437), Lord Chancellor of Ireland

See also
William Young (disambiguation)